Aries is a  mountain summit located within Olympic National Park in Jefferson County of Washington state. Its neighbors include Mount Olympus,  to the west, Athena  to the southwest, and Mount Mathias  to the northwest. Aries is wedged between the Hoh Glacier and the Humes Glacier, and immediately northeast of Blizzard Pass. Precipitation runoff from the mountain drains into headwaters of the Queets and Hoh Rivers. This mountain was named by glaciologists Richard Hubley and Edward LaChapelle in 1955, in preparation for the International Geophysical Year. It is named for Aries in keeping with the Greek and Roman mythology naming theme surrounding Mount Olympus.

Climate

Based on the Köppen climate classification, Aries is located in the marine west coast climate zone of western North America. Most weather fronts originate in the Pacific Ocean, and travel northeast toward the Olympic Mountains. As fronts approach, they are forced upward by the peaks of the Olympic Range, causing them to drop their moisture in the form of rain or snowfall (Orographic lift). As a result, the Olympics experience high precipitation, especially during the winter months. During winter months, weather is usually cloudy, but due to high pressure systems over the Pacific Ocean that intensify during summer months, there is often little or no cloud cover during the summer. The months July through September offer the most favorable weather for viewing or climbing this peak.

Geology

The Olympic Mountains are composed of obducted clastic wedge material and oceanic crust, primarily Eocene sandstone, turbidite, and basaltic oceanic crust. The mountains were sculpted during the Pleistocene era by erosion and glaciers advancing and retreating multiple times.

See also

 Olympic Mountains
 Geology of the Pacific Northwest

References

External links
 
 Weather forecast: National Weather Service

Olympic Mountains
Mountains of Washington (state)
Mountains of Jefferson County, Washington
Landforms of Olympic National Park
North American 1000 m summits